École secondaire Étienne-Brûlé is a French-language public high school located in Toronto, Ontario, Canada, named for a famous explorer. Part of the Conseil scolaire Viamonde, the school serves the French population of the Greater Toronto Area (GTA).

It is featured in the NFB documentary Une école sans frontières (A School Without Borders) by Nadine Valcin.

History
In 1969, École secondaire Étienne-Brûlé was founded. It was part of the Conseil scolaire de district du Centre-Sud-Ouest during the end of the 2000s. Étienne-Brûlé is currently the only public secular French-language secondary school in the North York region, and the only Conseil Scolaire Viamonde school in Toronto offering the Advanced Placement program.

Notable alumni
 Frank Baylis
 Marjolaine Boutin-Sweet
 Patrick Chan
 Rose Cossar
 Shady El Nahas
 Chantal Hébert
 Dan McTeague
 Paul Poirier

See also
List of high schools in Ontario

References

External links
 École secondaire Étienne-Brûlé

High schools in Toronto
French-language high schools in Ontario
Schools in the TDSB
Educational institutions established in 1969
1969 establishments in Ontario